Trimetric may refer to:

 Trimetric projection, one of 3 types of axonometric projection
 Chamberlin trimetric projection, a type of map projection
 Trimetric Classic or Three Character Classic, a Chinese text from the 13th century

See also
 Trimeter